The Waccasassa River is a small, isolated river in Levy County, Florida, flowing through the Gulf Hammock wetlands and emptying into the Gulf of Mexico. Three-quarters of the river is accessible only by canoe or kayak.

The average flow of the river near the town of Gulf Hammock during 1964–74 was 345 cubic feet/sec (/sec). Its tributaries include the Wekiva River and Otter Creek. Cow Creek joins the Waccasassa River just before its mouth opens out into the Gulf. Blue Springs, on the upper reaches of the Waccasassa River near Bronson, accounted for about 2.5 percent of the water flow of the river in 1964–74. The river above Blue Springs does not flow year-round. Wekiva Springs, on the Wekiva River, provided about 16 percent of the water flow of the Waccasassa River in 1964–74. Water flow in the Waccasassa River is affected by tides to above the town of Gulf Hammock.

The Waccasassa is one of the most underdeveloped rivers in Florida.  For most of its length it is surrounded by state owned or paper company owned land.  Paper companies are generally required to leave an unharvested border along navigable waterways.  The mouth is protected by the Waccasassa Bay State Preserve Park.

References

Gallery 

Bodies of water of Levy County, Florida
Rivers of Florida